The Type 97 81 mm infantry mortar was a Japanese mortar used primary by Imperial Japanese Army during World War II. The Type 97 designation was given to this gun as it was accepted in the year 2597 of the Japanese calendar (1937). It entered service in 1937. Japanese infantry units often are equipped with 81-mm mortars. The Type 97 81 mm mortar is very commonly used and is referred to by the Japanese as an "Infantry Gun", which breaks down into 3 sections for transport. The markings which appear on the base of the barrel read "97 model small trench mortar."

The modified version used by Imperial Japanese Navy with designation Type 3 mortar was used by naval land forces and as anti-submarine weapon on escort ships beginning in 1943.

Design

The Type 97 is a smooth bore, muzzle-loading weapon. It has a fixed firing pin in the breech assembly, and the percussion of the propelling cartridge of the mortar shell against the firing pin propels the shell from the mortar. As many as six propellant increments can be attached to the fins of the mortar shell for the purpose of increasing the range. The mortar and its calibre had its origin as almost all 81.4 mm, 82 mm or "8 cm" mortars in the French Brandt mle 27 81.4 mm mortar. The improved version Brandt Mle 27/31 had become the basis for copies, near-copies and license-built mortars all over the world. The Brandt mortars themselves were evolved from the British Stokes Mortar of different calibre.

A captured Type 97 mortar, which has been studied in detail, was marked "Type 97 High-Angle Infantry Gun". The weapon was manufactured in 1942 in the Osaka Army Arsenal. Although the Japanese weapon closely resembles the US 81-mm mortar, M1, there are several identifying features by which the two can be distinguished. The adjusting nut of the Japanese mortar is on the right bipod leg, while the sight is on the left. Other differences are the buttress-type threads on the traversing and elevating screws of the Japanese weapon, as well as the use of welding to fasten bipod legs to the clevis joint and grease fittings dissimilar to those used by the US model.

The collimator sight for the Type 97 Japanese mortar is heavier and more complicated than that utilized on the US 81-mm mortar Ml. The Japanese sight examined was made entirely of steel, except for the brass bushings used for the elevating and cross-leveling screws. A US M4 sight may be fitted to the Japanese weapon by shimming the sight bracket slightly.

The Type 97 mortar examined had an extension fitted to the sight, raising the latter to the level of the muzzle of the mortar. This extension probably was added to permit sighting of the weapon when it was deeply dug in or slightly in defilade. Elevation scale of the sight is graduated in 50-mil intervals from 700 to 1,600 mils, and a micrometer drum enables elevation readings to be made to the nearest mil. The collimator can be traversed in a full circle, and the azimuth scale is calibrated in 100-mil graduations in two sections of 3,200 mils each. As in the case of elevation, a micrometer drum permits azimuth readings to be made to the nearest mil. There is a throw-out lever for rapid traverse of the collimator, which may be placed at an angle of elevation and locked in position by a series of meshing notches. There are no open sights for rough laying of the piece.

Ammunition
Ammunition recovered for the Type 97 thus far is usually the Type 00 (1940) HE shell. The fuze is of the instantaneous type, which can be set for delay action, however, by the insertion of a delay pellet in the fuze nose prior to firing. The shell could be fired in the US 81-mm mortar M1, but the range was about 10 per cent shorter than achieved with the US M43 and M43A shells. The 81mm mortar was also used to launch an unusual AA Mine Discharger shell.

Specifications
Specifications of the weapon are as follows:

References

Notes

Bibliography
 War Department Special Series No 30 Japanese Mortars and Grenade Dischargers 1945
 War Department Handbook on Japanese Military Forces 1 October 1944

External links

 War Department TM-E 30-480 Handbook on Japanese Military Forces at hyperwar.org
 A Type 100 81mm mortar round at inert-ord.net

World War II infantry weapons of Japan
Infantry mortars of Japan
9
81mm mortars
Military equipment introduced in the 1930s